Following is a list of Sigma Phi members.

Arts and architecture

Business

Education

Entertainment

Government and public service

Law

Literature and journalism

Military

Politics

Religion

Science and medicine

Sports

See also
 Collegiate secret societies in North America

Reference 
Sigma Phi

Sigma Phi